Paul Bettany (born 27 May 1971) is an English actor. He is most well known for his roles as J.A.R.V.I.S. and Vision in the Marvel Cinematic Universe, and for starring in the Disney+ miniseries WandaVision (2021) for which he was nominated for a Primetime Emmy Award for Outstanding Lead Actor in a Limited or Anthology Series or Movie.

Bettany first gained popularity for appearing in the films Gangster No. 1 (2000), A Knight's Tale (2001) and A Beautiful Mind (2001). He was nominated for a BAFTA Award for Best Actor in a Supporting Role for playing Stephen Maturin in the film Master and Commander: The Far Side of the World (2003). Other films in which Bettany has appeared include Dogville (2003), Wimbledon (2004), The Da Vinci Code (2006), The Tourist (2010), Margin Call (2011), Legend (2015) and Solo: A Star Wars Story (2018). He made his directorial debut with the film Shelter (2014), which he also wrote and co-produced.

In television and theatre, Bettany has portrayed Ian Campbell, 11th Duke of Argyll in the series A Very British Scandal and Andy Warhol in the play The Collaboration in the West End, which is set to transfer to Broadway.

Early life
Bettany was born on 27 May 1971 in London, to Anne, a stage singer, theatre teacher, and stage manager, and Thane Bettany, a dancer, actor, drama teacher and godfather to Sophie, Duchess of Edinburgh. Bettany was raised Roman Catholic, although his church attendance drifted after his confirmation. Bettany then experimented with other Christian denominations among which were Methodist and Church of England congregations with his father. Bettany is now an atheist. While his father taught at the all-girls boarding school Queenswood School, near Hatfield, Hertfordshire, the family lived on the school grounds.

When Bettany was 16, his brother Matthew died at age 8 after falling onto concrete from a tennis pavilion roof at Queenswood. Soon after, Bettany dropped out of school, left home, and became a street performer in London. He lived in a small flat and earned money by playing his guitar in the streets as a busker. His parents later divorced. After two years, he found a new job in a home for the elderly. After working there for a year, Bettany enrolled at the Drama Centre in London. He had dyslexia prior to it being recognised as a learning difficulty.

Career
In 1990, at the age of 19, Bettany began a three-year course at the Drama Centre London in Chalk Farm. He made his stage debut in Stephen Daldry's acclaimed West End revival of An Inspector Calls at the Aldwych Theatre, playing the part of Eric Birling. He also appeared in the Royal Shakespeare Company's productions of Richard III, Romeo and Juliet, and Julius Caesar (for which he received a Charleson Award nomination). When Bettany was 21, he appeared in a BBC production of Oliver Twist, playing Bill Sikes.

After appearing in the finale of Sean Bean's series Sharpe as William II of the Netherlands at the Battle of Waterloo, he made his film debut with a small part in Bent, a Holocaust drama which also featured Clive Owen, Jude Law, and Ian McKellen. He continued doing work in stage and television: these included Joe Penhall's Love and Understanding, which played at London's Bush Theatre and then ran in Connecticut. He had roles in the television productions Killer Net and Coming Home, during which he met and dated Emily Mortimer. His last stage work was in One More Wasted Year and Stranger's House at the Royal Court Theatre. He filmed several more movies, including his first leading role in Gangster No. 1. The British Independent Film Awards nominated him for Best Actor, and the London Film Critics' Circle nominated him for British Newcomer of the Year. 

Back in Hollywood, writer/director Brian Helgeland (L.A. Confidential) was planning a new film called The Sin Eater (also known as The Order). He was impressed by Bettany's audition tape, though Helgeland eventually decided to film A Knight's Tale instead. The studio executives were not impressed, but Helgeland was determined to cast him, even writing the part of Chaucer for him. A Knight's Tale would be Bettany's first big Hollywood production. He received critical acclaim for A Knight's Tale, including winning the London Film Critics Circle Award for Best British Supporting Actor. After the movie wrapped, Helgeland, determined that Hollywood should recognize Bettany's talent, showed the audition tape to many of his peers, including Ron Howard, who promptly cast Bettany in A Beautiful Mind alongside Russell Crowe and Jennifer Connelly. After A Beautiful Mind, Bettany was offered the role of serial killer Francis Dolarhyde in Red Dragon, opposite Edward Norton and Anthony Hopkins. He turned down the role due to his commitment to a role in Lars von Trier's Dogville.

Bettany's next major project saw him starring again alongside A Beautiful Mind costar Russell Crowe in Peter Weir's Master and Commander: The Far Side of the World. His portrayal of surgeon and naturalist Stephen Maturin brought him a BAFTA nomination, and he was named British Actor of the Year (London Film Critics' Circle), and Best Actor (Evening Standard).

On 28 June 2004, Bettany and 13 other actors were included in the 2004 invitation to join the Academy of Motion Picture Arts and Sciences. Dogville and The Reckoning were released in limited cinemas in 2004. In September of that year, Bettany made his leading-man debut in Wimbledon, a romantic comedy with Kirsten Dunst. The film's cast would also introduce him to Jon Favreau, playing his manager, a relationship that would return when Favreau cast him as the voice of J.A.R.V.I.S. in Iron Man. In mid-2005, Bettany filmed Firewall in Vancouver, Canada, a thriller also starring Harrison Ford and Virginia Madsen, which reunited him with Wimbledon director Richard Loncraine. He spent the autumn of 2005 filming The Da Vinci Code, based on Dan Brown's best-selling novel and starring Tom Hanks, Audrey Tautou and Ian McKellen. In the film, he played an Opus Dei monk named Silas.

In 2007, Bettany went to London to star in There For Me, written by his friends Dan Fredenburgh and Doraly Rosen. In 2008, he appeared in the New Line Cinema family fantasy Inkheart, playing the part of a fire-eater named Dustfinger. In 2009, he appeared as Charles Darwin in Creation, starring opposite his own wife Jennifer Connelly. In 2010, Bettany appeared alongside Johnny Depp and Angelina Jolie in The Tourist and portrayed the archangel Michael in Legion, a film depicting divine vengeance upon humanity. He starred in the films Priest and Margin Call, both released in 2011.

Bettany reprised his voice role as J.A.R.V.I.S. in 2010's Iron Man 2, 2012's The Avengers, 2013's Iron Man 3, and Disneyland's Innoventions attraction. In 2014, Bettany starred alongside Johnny Depp and fellow British actor Rebecca Hall in the feature film Transcendence. He was once again paired with Depp in Mortdecai, a 2015 motion picture also starring Gwyneth Paltrow and Ewan McGregor. After voicing J.A.R.V.I.S. for five years, Bettany made his first onscreen appearance in a Marvel Cinematic Universe film in the 2015 film Avengers: Age of Ultron, playing Vision. He reprised the role in the sequels Captain America: Civil War (2016) and Avengers: Infinity War (2018).

Bettany portrayed Ted Kaczynski in the Discovery Channel television show, Manhunt: Unabomber. Bettany replaced Michael K. Williams in Solo: A Star Wars Story, after Williams was removed from the final film, as he was unable to return to set during the film's reshoots. Bettany was cast in his place, with the character being reworked from a motion-capture alien to a human. On 20 January 2018, it was reported that Bettany was nearing a deal to play Prince Philip, Duke of Edinburgh on the Netflix series The Crown, succeeding Matt Smith. Days later, on 25 January, it was reported by TVLine that Bettany was ultimately unable to sign on due to scheduling conflicts.

Bettany starred alongside Elizabeth Olsen in the Marvel television miniseries WandaVision, portraying a new version of his Marvel Cinematic Universe character, Vision, with Olsen portraying the titular Wanda. It premiered on Disney+ in January 2021, garnering praise from critics. Reviewing the series, Matt Purslow of IGN wrote Bettany "effortlessly takes to the comedic skits" and that he and Olsen "provide a fantastic amount of life, wit, and emotion". For his performance, Bettany received nominations for the Primetime Emmy Award for Outstanding Lead Actor in a Limited or Anthology Series or Movie and Golden Globe Award for Best Actor – Miniseries or Television Film.

Bettany starred in the 2021 miniseries A Very British Scandal. He played artist Andy Warhol in a production of the play The Collaboration by Anthony McCarten at the Young Vic in London from February to April 2022. He is slated to reprise the role in a film adaptation of the play. Bettany is attached to portray businessman Alexander Nix in a film about the Facebook–Cambridge Analytica data scandal as well as co-write and star in the dramedy film Harvest Moon.

Bettany will reprise his role as Vision in the television series Vision Quest.

Personal life
On 1 January 2003, Bettany married American actress Jennifer Connelly in Scotland; they met when they starred together in the 2001 film A Beautiful Mind. They did not become a couple until some time after filming, as both were in other relationships at the time. As a teenager, he had developed a crush on her after seeing her in the 1986 film Labyrinth. The September 11 attacks motivated him to act on his feelings for her, and after two days of attempting to contact her, he proposed, despite the fact that they were not yet in a relationship. Soon after their marriage, they moved to Brooklyn Heights after living in Tribeca. The couple have two children together. Bettany is stepfather to Connelly's son from a previous marriage.

Bettany is close friends with actor Johnny Depp. Text messages between Bettany and Depp from 2013 were used as evidence in 2020 during Depp's defamation trial against The Sun and in 2022 as part of Depp's defamation trial against his ex-wife, actress Amber Heard.

Filmography

Film

Television

Theatre

Awards and nominations

Notes

References

External links 

 
 
 

1971 births
20th-century British male actors
21st-century British male actors
Alumni of the Drama Centre London
Audiobook narrators
British buskers
British expatriate male actors in the United States
English atheists
English expatriates in the United States
English male film actors
English male stage actors
English male television actors
English male video game actors
English male voice actors
Former Roman Catholics
Independent Spirit Award winners
Living people
Male actors from London
People from Harlesden
People from Shepherd's Bush
People from Tribeca
Royal Shakespeare Company members